Island College of Technology (abbreviated KICT) is a private college in Malaysia. Established in 1998, it shared a building with the Tabung Haji Complex; difficulties with this arrangement led to the college relocating to its present location at Sungai Rusa, Balik Pulau, Pulau Pinang.

See also
 List of universities in Malaysia

External links 

Official website

Colleges in Malaysia
Universities and colleges in Penang
Educational institutions established in 1998
1998 establishments in Malaysia